Eduard Teodorovych Kozynkevych (born 23 May 1949; died 16 November 1994) was a Ukrainian footballer.

International career
He earned 6 caps for the USSR national football team, and participated in UEFA Euro 1972.

External links
Profile 

1949 births
Sportspeople from Lviv
1994 deaths
Ukrainian footballers
Soviet footballers
Association football forwards
Soviet Union international footballers
UEFA Euro 1972 players
Soviet Top League players
FC Karpaty Lviv players
FC Shakhtar Donetsk players
FC Dynamo Moscow players